This is the discography for Scottish alternative rock singer, Sharleen Spiteri. For her work within the Scottish rock band Texas, see Texas discography. Her debut solo album Melody was released in 2008 and charted at number 3 on the UK Albums Chart. Her second solo album, The Movie Songbook, was released on 1 March 2010.

Studio albums

Singles

As lead artist

As featured artist
 "Nothing 2 Prove" (Roger Sanchez featuring Sharleen Spiteri) (2002)
 "Stirb nicht vor mir (Don't Die Before I Do) " (Rammstein featuring Sharleen Spiteri) (2005)

Other appearances
 Gun – Taking on the World (1989) – backing vocals on tracks "The Feeling Within" and "I Will Be Waiting"

See also
Sharleen Spiteri
Texas

References

Discographies of British artists
Pop music discographies